Crossotus bifasciatus is a species of beetle in the family Cerambycidae. It was described by Kolbe in 1900.

References

bifasciatus
Beetles described in 1900